Hartwick is a former townsite in Delhi Township, Delaware County, Iowa, United States.

Geography
The community was on the Maquoketa River, at the crossing of 220th Avenue, southwest of Delhi.

History

Early years
The Hartwick post office opened on January 1, 1853, and operated until September 24, 1861. It was reestablished on June 12, 1872, and closed permanently on December 10 of the same year.

John W. Clark founded and platted Hartwick in Section 30 of Delhi Township in December 1858. Clark had previously built a saw mill in 1849 and a flour mill in 1853. John Whitman started a blacksmith shop in Hartwick in 1855; this was followed by a cobbler, a brickyard, and a paint shop. The Hartwick Bridge, a bowstring through truss bridge, spanned the river next to Furman's Mill.

Decline
By the turn of the century, Hartwick's heyday was over; the community's founder, John Clark, had left the community in 1861, followed by several others. Clark's house was leased to the county as a poor farm.

By 1914, a history of the county called Hartwick a "forgotten village". Hartwick still appeared on maps in the early 20th century, but with decreasing frequency.

Today, the site of Hartwick is still marked by the replacement Hartwick Bridge across the river; there is also a marina called Hartwick Marina, and the Hartwick Amish General Store.

See also
York, Iowa

References

Geography of Delaware County, Iowa
Ghost towns in Iowa